The Roman Catholic Diocese of Sumbe is a diocese located in the city of Sumbe in the Ecclesiastical province of Luanda in Angola.

History
 10 August 1975: Established as Diocese of Ngunza from the Metropolitan Archdiocese of Luanda
 3 February 1977: Renamed as Diocese of Novo Redondo
 22 October 2006: Renamed as Diocese of Sumbe

Special churches
The Cathedral of the diocese is Sé Catedral de Nossa Senhora da Conceição (Our Lady of the Conception Cathedral) in Sumbe.

Bishops

Ordinaries, in reverse chronological order
 Bishops of Sumbe (Roman rite), below
 Bishop Luzizil Kiala (21 May 2013  – 29 September 2021), appointed Archbishop of Malanje
 Bishop Benedito Roberto, C.S.Sp. (22 October 2006  – 19 May 2012), appointed Archbishop of Malanje; see below
 Bishops of Novo Redondo (Roman rite), below
 Bishop Benedito Roberto, C.S.Sp. (15 December 1995  – 22 October 2006); see above
 Bishop Zacarias Kamwenho (3 February 1977  – 3 March 1995.), appointed Coadjutor Archbishop of Luango; see below
 Bishop of Ngunza (Roman rite), below 
 Bishop Zacarias Kamwenho (10 August 1975  – 3 February 1977); see above

See also
Roman Catholicism in Angola

Sources
 GCatholic.org

Roman Catholic dioceses in Angola
Christian organizations established in 1975
Roman Catholic dioceses and prelatures established in the 20th century
Sumbe, Roman Catholic Diocese of